Shooting Star is an album by Elkie Brooks.

Background
Brooks' third album was a departure from her previous work and enjoyed relative success in the UK charts. Taking the place of Leiber & Stoller was renowned producer David Kershenbaum who guided Brooks along a more funk-orientated sound than on her previous work. The album has been released on CD, paired with its 1979 successor Live and Learn.

Single releases
"Only Love Can Break Your Heart" (UK #43, 1978)
"Since You Went Away" (1978)
"Stay With Me" (Germany and Netherlands only, 1978)

Details
Recorded in 1978 at CBS Studios in London, England, and at Producers Workshop in Los Angeles, USA. Mastered at A&M Studios in Los Angeles.
Issued on vinyl and cassette in 1978 through A&M Records.
Shooting Star reached number 20 and remained in the UK charts for 13 weeks.

Track listing 
 "Only Love Can Break Your Heart" (Neil Young) - 3:07
 "Be Positive" (Elkie Brooks) - 3:50
 "Since You Went Away" (Jean Roussel, Jerry Knight) - 3:44
 "Putting My Heart On the Line" (Peter Frampton) - 3:11
 "Stay With Me" (Ronnie Wood, Rod Stewart) - 3:04
 "As" (Stevie Wonder) - 4:15
 "Learn to Love" (Ned Doheny) - 4:04
 "Too Precious" (Elkie Brooks, Tim Hinkley) - 4:25
 "Shooting Star" (Pete Gage) - 2:50
 "Just An Excuse" (Elkie Brooks) - 3:38

Personnel
Elkie Brooks – vocals
Elliott Randall - guitars
Jean Roussel - keyboards
Andy Newmark - drums
Jerry Knight - bass, backing vocals

Additional personnel
Pete Gage - guitars
Simon Morton - percussion
Mike Ross, Andrew Clark, Mark Smith, Ed Schaff - engineering
Bernie Grundman - mastering
David Kershenbaum - production

References

1978 albums
Elkie Brooks albums
A&M Records albums
Albums produced by David Kershenbaum